Partula thetis is a species of air-breathing tropical land snail, a terrestrial pulmonate gastropod mollusk in the family Partulidae. This species is endemic to Palau.

References

Fauna of Palau
Partula (gastropod)
Endemic fauna of Palau
Taxonomy articles created by Polbot
Taxobox binomials not recognized by IUCN